Michael Kirby is a street artist who was born in Baltimore, Maryland, United States. His work has been featured and exhibited across the world for governments, cities, museums, and corporations.

Biography

Michael Kirby went to study in Italy at the age of 18 and learned the techniques of fresco painting. Here he also discovered the art of street painting or ephemeral murals. He began to create ephemeral pieces in Florence. After a while he began to do more original work on the pavement in larger scales and began to be noticed by more than just tourists of Florence and picked up many jobs as a muralist. Kirby moved to Rome and worked in a studio for 4 years working across Europe creating murals and street paintings.

As a street painter, Kirby has won various competitions and been featured in numerous festivals and galleries across the world.  The LA Times wrote that "Michael Kirby is one of the best street painters in the world." Mr. Kirby was the first street painter to break away from the traditional methods and themes of the Renaissance. He was the first street painter to create original art based on contemporary designs and themes allowed him to take the art form across Europe, and North and South America. He has worked in over 200 cities including Rome, Paris, London, Berlin, New York, Mexico City, Guadalajara, San Francisco, Caracas, and Cartagena. He is now contracted by corporations and museums around the world.

After working and studying in Europe as a muralist, Kirby wanted to learn more modern mural techniques and moved to Mexico. Here he started working as an apprentice for various mural masters. During these studies he was commissioned to do various murals for private and public buildings and eventually he started his own studio in Guadalajara.

In the 2002, Kirby returned to the city of his birth to create a new studio using the techniques he has learned abroad. His latest studio is called "Murals of Baltimore" which is a company that creates frescos, keim murals, marouflage, mosaics, street paintings, and other forms of public art.

Projects
In 2007 Michael Kirby created an 8 x 45 meter mural of the Life of Pocahontas outside the home of Pocahontas, Werowocomoco, in Gloucester, Virginia for the 400 Anniversary Celebration.

Kirby has been contracted by McDonald's Corp., The Black Eyed Peas, Earthlink, Honda Civic Tour, Johns Hopkins University, and other corporations for three-dimensional street paintings. He has also created murals for CSX Transportation, City of Baltimore, City of Guadalajara, Chiesa San Paolo in Napoli, Italy, Smithsonian Institution, and others. As well as giving lectures in Johns Hopkins University, North Carolina Museum of Art, and others.

Media
Kirby's work has been featured in news outlets and media. He was featured on the Late Show with David Letterman and his work has been on Culpo Di Fulmine Show in Italy and German Public Television documentary on Cologne. His work has been featured on various television outlets such as ABC, Fox, and NBC.

Various newspapers and magazines have also written articles about his work such as LA Times, Baltimore Sun, Mural Guadalajara, Il Tempo Roma, Venezia Gazzetta and Il Publico.

References

External links
Michael Kirby's studio site

Living people
Year of birth missing (living people)
American artists